E 511 is a European B class road in France, connecting the cities Courtenay – Troyes.

Route and E-road junctions 
 
 Courtenay:  E60
 Troyes

External links 
 UN Economic Commission for Europe: Overall Map of E-road Network (2007)
 International E-road network

International E-road network
Roads in France